Kimberly S. Corban (born 1985) is a rape survivor and rape victim advocate. She is notable for her nationally televised question at CNN's 'Guns in America' Town hall hosted by Anderson Cooper with former president Barack Obama to discuss the Second Amendment and her 2018 TEDx Talk, 'How my sexual assault was hijacked by politicians and lobbies'.

Background
In May 2006, when Corban was a 20-year-old college student, a stranger broke into her off-campus apartment at the University of Northern Colorado, held her there for two hours, and raped her. After surviving the assault, she immediately reported the crime to the Greeley Police Department.  She later served as the key witness in her attacker's 2007 Weld County, Colorado trial, resulting in a burglary and sexual assault conviction. Her rapist is currently serving a 24-life term in a Colorado prison.

Following the jury's guilty verdict, Corban released her name to the media, intending to serve as an example for other rape victims to come forward.  She has given presentations to numerous advocate groups, high schools and colleges, justice professionals, and various government agencies internationally on sexual assaults, using her case to illustrate how she believes the criminal justice system should work.

Corban graduated from the University of Northern Colorado with a bachelor's degree in Psychology and master's degree in Criminal Justice. She worked as a victim advocate for her local police department and later at the District Attorney's office, creating and running the Adult Diversion Program.

In January 2016, Kimberly Corban attended CNN's 'Guns in America' Townhall with Barack Obama. Corban shared with the president her survivor story and then described her belief that she had the basic responsibility to protect herself and her children by exercising her right to bear arms and carry her weapon as well.

Corban delivered a TEDx talk on December 1, 2018, titled 'How my sexual assault was hijacked by politicians and lobbies'. The talk discussed how both sides of the political spectrum weaponize survivors of sexual assault to gain money, power, and votes.

Corban has been featured on many major news networks, including CNN, Fox News, and The Blaze. She appears on syndicated radio programs and in print media, including The Washington Post, USA Today, Cosmopolitan magazine, Elle magazine, MSN.com, and The New York Times. Today, she travels the country speaking on victim advocacy and best practices for supporting trauma survivors while co-hosting a podcast called Life As She Knows It.

References

External links
 

1985 births
American gun rights activists
American victims of crime
Sexual abuse victim advocates
Crime victim advocates
Living people
University of Northern Colorado alumni